The 5th ACTRA Awards were presented on April 21, 1976. The ceremony was hosted by Pierre Berton.

Winners

References

1976 in Canadian television
ACTRA
ACTRA Awards